Anhar-e Olya (also Romanized as Anhar-e ‘Olyā; also known as Anhar) is a village in Rowzeh Chay Rural District, in the Central District of Urmia County, West Azerbaijan Province, Iran. At the 2006 census, its population was 785, in 222 families.

See also
 Assyrians in Iran
 List of Assyrian settlements

References 

Populated places in Urmia County
Assyrian settlements